Tall-e Beyza (also Romanized as Tall-e Beyẕā, Tal-e Baiza, and Tol-e Beyẕā) is a village in Beyza Rural District, Beyza District, Sepidan County, Fars Province, Iran. At the 2006 census, its population was 801, in 202 families.

References 

Populated places in Beyza County